In mathematics, a closed-form expression is a mathematical expression that uses a finite number of standard operations. It may contain constants, variables, certain well-known operations (e.g., + − × ÷), and functions (e.g., nth root, exponent, logarithm, trigonometric functions, and inverse hyperbolic functions), but usually no limit, or integral. 

The set of operations and functions may vary with author and context.

Usually, if a function is allowed for closed form expressions, its derivative can be expressed as a closed-form  expression. So, by the chain rule, the derivatives may be removed from closed-form expressions. As the expression of a derivative may be much larger than that of the function, it is only a question of convenience whether derivatives are accepted in closed-form expressions.

Example: roots of polynomials 

The solutions of any quadratic equation with complex coefficients can be expressed in closed form in terms of addition, subtraction, multiplication, division, and square root extraction, each of which is an elementary function. For example, the quadratic equation

is tractable since its solutions can be expressed as a closed-form expression, i.e. in terms of elementary functions:

Similarly, solutions of cubic and quartic (third and fourth degree) equations can be expressed using arithmetic, square roots, and th roots. However, there are quintic equations without such closed-form solutions, for example ; this is Abel–Ruffini theorem.

The study of the existence of closed forms for polynomial roots is the initial motivation and one of the main achievements of the area of mathematics named Galois theory.

Alternative definitions 

Changing the definition of "well known" to include additional functions can change the set of equations with closed-form solutions.  Many cumulative distribution functions cannot be expressed in closed form, unless one considers special functions such as the error function or gamma function to be well known.  It is possible to solve the quintic equation if general hypergeometric functions are included, although the solution is far too complicated algebraically to be useful.  For many practical computer applications, it is entirely reasonable to assume that the gamma function and other special functions are well known since numerical implementations are widely available.

Analytic expression 

An analytic expression (also known as expression in analytic form or analytic formula) is a mathematical expression constructed using well-known operations that lend themselves readily to calculation. Similar to closed-form expressions, the set of well-known functions allowed can vary according to context but always includes the basic arithmetic operations (addition, subtraction, multiplication, and division), exponentiation to a real exponent (which includes extraction of the th root), logarithms, and trigonometric functions.

However, the class of expressions considered to be analytic expressions tends to be wider than that for closed-form expressions. In particular, special functions such as the Bessel functions and the gamma function are usually allowed, and often so are infinite series and continued fractions. On the other hand, limits in general, and integrals in particular, are typically excluded.

If an analytic expression involves only the algebraic operations (addition, subtraction, multiplication, division, and exponentiation to a rational exponent) and rational constants then it is more specifically referred to as an algebraic expression.

Comparison of different classes of expressions 

Closed-form expressions are an important sub-class of analytic expressions, which contain a bounded or an unbounded number of applications of well-known functions. Unlike the broader analytic expressions, the closed-form expressions do not include infinite series or continued fractions; neither includes integrals or limits. Indeed, by the Stone–Weierstrass theorem, any continuous function on the unit interval can be expressed as a limit of polynomials, so any class of functions containing the polynomials and closed under limits will necessarily include all continuous functions.

Similarly,  an equation or system of equations is said to have a closed-form solution if, and only if, at least one solution can be expressed as a closed-form expression; and it is said to have an analytic solution if and only if at least one solution can be expressed as an analytic expression. A closed-form or analytic solution is sometimes referred to as an explicit solution.

Dealing with non-closed-form expressions

Transformation into closed-form expressions 

The expression:

is not in closed form because the summation entails an infinite number of elementary operations. However, by summing a geometric series this expression can be expressed in the closed form:

Differential Galois theory 

The integral of a closed-form expression may or may not itself be expressible as a closed-form expression. This study is referred to as differential Galois theory, by analogy with algebraic Galois theory.

The basic theorem of differential Galois theory is due to Joseph Liouville in the 1830s and 1840s and hence referred to as Liouville's theorem.

A standard example of an elementary function whose antiderivative does not have a closed-form expression is:  whose one antiderivative is (up to a multiplicative constant) the error function:

Mathematical modelling and computer simulation 

Equations or systems too complex for closed-form or analytic solutions can often be analysed by mathematical modelling and computer simulation.

Closed-form number 

Three subfields of the complex numbers  have been suggested as encoding the notion of a "closed-form number"; in increasing order of generality, these are the Liouvillian numbers (not to be confused with Liouville numbers in the sense of rational approximation), EL numbers and elementary numbers. "EL" stands both for "exponential–logarithmic" and as an abbreviation for "elementary".

Whether a number is a closed-form number is related to whether a number is transcendental. Formally, Liouvillian numbers and elementary numbers contain the algebraic numbers, and they include some but not all transcendental numbers. In contrast, EL numbers do not contain all algebraic numbers, but do include some transcendental numbers. Closed-form numbers can be studied via transcendental number theory, in which a major result is the Gelfond–Schneider theorem, and a major open question is Schanuel's conjecture.

Numerical computations 

For purposes of numeric computations, being in closed form is not in general necessary, as many limits and integrals can be efficiently computed.

Conversion from numerical forms 

There is software that attempts to find closed-form expressions for numerical values, including RIES,  in Maple and SymPy, Plouffe's Inverter, and the Inverse Symbolic Calculator.

See also

References

Further reading

External links 
 
 Closed-form continuous-time neural networks

Algebra
Special functions